Elisha I. Winter (July 15, 1781 – June 30, 1849) was a U.S. Representative from New York.

Biography
Born in New York City on July 15, 1781, in 1806 Winter moved to the portion of the town of Peru, Clinton County, which was later included in the township of Au Sable. While living in Clinton County he became involved in mining iron ore from a location known as the Winter Ore Bed.

He was elected as a Federalist to the Thirteenth Congress (March 4, 1813 – March 3, 1815). Winter was an unsuccessful candidate for reelection in 1814 to the Fourteenth Congress.

He later moved to a farm near Lexington, Kentucky, and became a planter and was active in other ventures, including ownership of a general store.  He was also instrumental in building the first railroad in that locality, and subsequently became president of the Lexington and Ohio Railroad. Winter was a slave owner.

Winter died in Lexington, Kentucky on June 30, 1849 and was interred in Lexington Cemetery.

References

External links

Sources

1781 births
1849 deaths
Politicians from New York City
American planters
Federalist Party members of the United States House of Representatives from New York (state)
19th-century American politicians